Sedecula is a genus of fungi in the order Agaricales. It is incertae sedis with respect to familial placement within the order. The genus is monotypic, containing the single species Sedecula pulvinata, found in the United States, and first described by American mycologist Sanford Myron Zeller in 1941.

References

Agaricales enigmatic taxa
Taxa described in 1941
Fungi of North America
Monotypic Agaricales genera